Dimitrios Mitoglou (born 11 January 1962) is a Greek retired football defender.

Personal life
He is the father of basketballer Dinos Mitoglou and footballer Gerasimos Mitoglou.

References

1962 births
Living people
Greek footballers
Super League Greece players
Doxa Drama F.C. players
PAOK FC players
Irodotos FC players
Association football defenders
Footballers from Drama, Greece